The  is the governing body for the sport of sailing in Japan, recognised by the International Sailing Federation.

References

External links
 
ISAF MNA Microsite

Sailing in Japan
National members of World Sailing
Sailing
Yachting associations
Sailing governing bodies
1932 establishments in Japan
Sports organizations established in 1932